Nigeria won their first two games while Paraguay drew their first two games 0–0, which meant that Nigeria were certain of qualifying in first place with a game to spare. In their final game, Spain got their only victory after scoring six against Bulgaria, but were still eliminated in third place after Paraguay beat Nigeria. Thus, Spain were the only top seed not to advance to the second round, while all others topped their respective groups.

Standings

Nigeria advanced to play Denmark (runner-up of Group C) in the round of 16.
Paraguay advanced to play France (winner of Group C) in the round of 16.

Matches

Paraguay vs Bulgaria

Spain vs Nigeria

Nigeria vs Bulgaria

Spain vs Paraguay

Nigeria vs Paraguay

Spain vs Bulgaria

Group D
Group
Bulgaria at the 1998 FIFA World Cup
Group
Group